Spurgeon may refer to:

Places

United States
 Spurgeon, Indiana, a town
 Spurgeon, Missouri, an unincorporated community
 Spurgeon, Tennessee, a census-designated place
 Spurgeon Creek, Washington

Australia
 Spurgeon, Queensland, a locality

People with the given name
 Spud Chandler (1907–1990), American Major League Baseball pitcher
 Spurgeon Cherry (c. 1912–1968), American college football and basketball player and basketball coach
 Spurgeon Neel (1919–2003), U.S. Army physician
 Spurgeon Tucker (1894–1968), American painter and lithographer

People with the surname
 Adelaide Thompson Spurgeon (c1826–1907), American Civil War nurse 
Caroline Spurgeon (1869–1942), English literary critic
 Charles Spurgeon (1834–1892), British Baptist preacher
 Dennis Spurgeon (born 1943), American nuclear engineer
 Freddy Spurgeon (1900–1970), American baseball player
 Jared Spurgeon (born 1989), Canadian ice hockey player
 Jay Spurgeon (born 1976), American baseball player
 Keith Spurgeon (1933–1990), English football player and manager
 Sarah Spurgeon (born 1963), English electrical engineer 
 Thomas Spurgeon (1856–1917), son of Charles Spurgeon; also a British Baptist preacher
 Tim Spurgeon (born 1960), American racing driver
 Tom Spurgeon (1968–2019), American comic critic
 Tyler Spurgeon (born 1986), Canadian ice hockey player
 William H. Spurgeon (1829–1915), founder of Santa Ana, California

Other uses
 Spurgeons, an English charity founded by Charles Spurgeon
 Spurgeon's College, London, founded by Charles Spurgeon

See also
 O. Spurgeon English (1901–1993), American psychiatrist and psychoanalyst
 Spergon Wynn (born 1978), former football quarterback